ANM Nazrul Islam (1940–23 June 2020) is a Awami League politician and the former Member of Parliament of Mymensingh-16.

Career 
Islam was elected to the National Assembly of Pakistan in 1970. During Bangladesh Liberation war he worked as an aide to Syed Nazrul Islam of the Mujibnagar Government. He was elected to parliament from Mymensingh-16 as an Awami League candidate in 1973.

Death 
Islam died on 23 June 2020 in Dhaka, Bangladesh.

References 

Awami League politicians
2020 deaths
1st Jatiya Sangsad members
1940 births